Lepidoptera of Austria consist of both the butterflies and moths recorded from Austria.

Moths

Gelechiidae
Acompsia cinerella (Clerck, 1759)
Acompsia maculosella (Stainton, 1851)
Acompsia minorella Rebel, 1899
Acompsia tripunctella (Denis & Schiffermuller, 1775)
Acompsia schmidtiellus (Heyden, 1848)
Agonochaetia intermedia Sattler, 1968
Altenia scriptella (Hübner, 1796)
Anacampsis blattariella (Hübner, 1796)
Anacampsis hirsutella (Constant, 1885)
Anacampsis obscurella (Denis & Schiffermuller, 1775)
Anacampsis populella (Clerck, 1759)
Anacampsis scintillella (Fischer von Röslerstamm, 1841)
Anacampsis temerella (Lienig & Zeller, 1846)
Anacampsis timidella (Wocke, 1887)
Anarsia lineatella Zeller, 1839
Anarsia spartiella (Schrank, 1802)
Anasphaltis renigerellus (Zeller, 1839)
Apodia bifractella (Duponchel, 1843)
Aproaerema anthyllidella (Hübner, 1813)
Argolamprotes micella (Denis & Schiffermuller, 1775)
Aristotelia brizella (Treitschke, 1833)
Aristotelia decurtella (Hübner, 1813)
Aristotelia ericinella (Zeller, 1839)
Aristotelia heliacella (Herrich-Schäffer, 1854)
Aristotelia leonhardi Krone, 1907
Aristotelia subdecurtella (Stainton, 1859)
Aristotelia subericinella (Duponchel, 1843)
Aroga flavicomella (Zeller, 1839)
Aroga velocella (Duponchel, 1838)
Athrips amoenella (Frey, 1882)
Athrips mouffetella (Linnaeus, 1758)
Athrips nigricostella (Duponchel, 1842)
Athrips pruinosella (Lienig & Zeller, 1846)
Athrips rancidella (Herrich-Schäffer, 1854)
Atremaea lonchoptera Staudinger, 1871
Brachmia blandella (Fabricius, 1798)
Brachmia dimidiella (Denis & Schiffermuller, 1775)
Brachmia inornatella (Douglas, 1850)
Brachmia procursella Rebel, 1903
Bryotropha affinis (Haworth, 1828)
Bryotropha basaltinella (Zeller, 1839)
Bryotropha boreella (Douglas, 1851)
Bryotropha desertella (Douglas, 1850)
Bryotropha domestica (Haworth, 1828)
Bryotropha galbanella (Zeller, 1839)
Bryotropha senectella (Zeller, 1839)
Bryotropha similis (Stainton, 1854)
Bryotropha terrella (Denis & Schiffermuller, 1775)
Carpatolechia aenigma (Sattler, 1983)
Carpatolechia alburnella (Zeller, 1839)
Carpatolechia decorella (Haworth, 1812)
Carpatolechia fugacella (Zeller, 1839)
Carpatolechia fugitivella (Zeller, 1839)
Carpatolechia minor (Kasy, 1978)
Carpatolechia notatella (Hübner, 1813)
Carpatolechia proximella (Hübner, 1796)
Caryocolum albifaciella (Heinemann, 1870)
Caryocolum alsinella (Zeller, 1868)
Caryocolum amaurella (M. Hering, 1924)
Caryocolum blandella (Douglas, 1852)
Caryocolum blandelloides Karsholt, 1981
Caryocolum cassella (Walker, 1864)
Caryocolum cauligenella (Schmid, 1863)
Caryocolum fischerella (Treitschke, 1833)
Caryocolum huebneri (Haworth, 1828)
Caryocolum interalbicella (Herrich-Schäffer, 1854)
Caryocolum junctella (Douglas, 1851)
Caryocolum klosi (Rebel, 1917)
Caryocolum kroesmanniella (Herrich-Schäffer, 1854)
Caryocolum leucomelanella (Zeller, 1839)
Caryocolum leucothoracellum (Klimesch, 1953)
Caryocolum marmorea (Haworth, 1828)
Caryocolum moehringiae (Klimesch, 1954)
Caryocolum mucronatella (Chretien, 1900)
Caryocolum oculatella (Thomann, 1930)
Caryocolum peregrinella (Herrich-Schäffer, 1854)
Caryocolum petrophila (Preissecker, 1914)
Caryocolum petryi (O. Hofmann, 1899)
Caryocolum proxima (Haworth, 1828)
Caryocolum pullatella (Tengstrom, 1848)
Caryocolum repentis Huemer & Luquet, 1992
Caryocolum saginella (Zeller, 1868)
Caryocolum schleichi (Christoph, 1872)
Caryocolum tischeriella (Zeller, 1839)
Caryocolum trauniella (Zeller, 1868)
Caryocolum tricolorella (Haworth, 1812)
Caryocolum vicinella (Douglas, 1851)
Caryocolum viscariella (Stainton, 1855)
Caulastrocecis furfurella (Staudinger, 1871)
Chionodes continuella (Zeller, 1839)
Chionodes distinctella (Zeller, 1839)
Chionodes electella (Zeller, 1839)
Chionodes fumatella (Douglas, 1850)
Chionodes hayreddini Kocak, 1986
Chionodes holosericella (Herrich-Schäffer, 1854)
Chionodes luctuella (Hübner, 1793)
Chionodes lugubrella (Fabricius, 1794)
Chionodes nebulosella (Heinemann, 1870)
Chionodes perpetuella (Herrich-Schäffer, 1854)
Chionodes praeclarella (Herrich-Schäffer, 1854)
Chionodes tragicella (Heyden, 1865)
Chionodes viduella (Fabricius, 1794)
Chrysoesthia drurella (Fabricius, 1775)
Chrysoesthia sexguttella (Thunberg, 1794)
Chrysoesthia verrucosa Tokar, 1999
Coleotechnites piceaella (Kearfott, 1903)
Cosmardia moritzella (Treitschke, 1835)
Crossobela trinotella (Herrich-Schäffer, 1856)
Dactylotula altithermella (Walsingham, 1903)
Dichomeris alacella (Zeller, 1839)
Dichomeris barbella (Denis & Schiffermuller, 1775)
Dichomeris derasella (Denis & Schiffermuller, 1775)
Dichomeris juniperella (Linnaeus, 1761)
Dichomeris latipennella (Rebel, 1937)
Dichomeris limosellus (Schlager, 1849)
Dichomeris marginella (Fabricius, 1781)
Dichomeris ustalella (Fabricius, 1794)
Ephysteris inustella (Zeller, 1847)
Eulamprotes atrella (Denis & Schiffermuller, 1775)
Eulamprotes libertinella (Zeller, 1872)
Eulamprotes plumbella (Heinemann, 1870)
Eulamprotes superbella (Zeller, 1839)
Eulamprotes unicolorella (Duponchel, 1843)
Eulamprotes wilkella (Linnaeus, 1758)
Exoteleia dodecella (Linnaeus, 1758)
Exoteleia succinctella (Zeller, 1872)
Filatima incomptella (Herrich-Schäffer, 1854)
Filatima spurcella (Duponchel, 1843)
Filatima tephritidella (Duponchel, 1844)
Gelechia asinella (Hübner, 1796)
Gelechia basipunctella Herrich-Schäffer, 1854
Gelechia cuneatella Douglas, 1852
Gelechia hippophaella (Schrank, 1802)
Gelechia muscosella Zeller, 1839
Gelechia nigra (Haworth, 1828)
Gelechia rhombella (Denis & Schiffermuller, 1775)
Gelechia rhombelliformis Staudinger, 1871
Gelechia sabinellus (Zeller, 1839)
Gelechia scotinella Herrich-Schäffer, 1854
Gelechia senticetella (Staudinger, 1859)
Gelechia sestertiella Herrich-Schäffer, 1854
Gelechia sororculella (Hübner, 1817)
Gelechia turpella (Denis & Schiffermuller, 1775)
Gnorimoschema epithymella (Staudinger, 1859)
Gnorimoschema hoefneri (Rebel, 1909)
Gnorimoschema nilsi Huemer, 1996
Gnorimoschema steueri Povolny, 1975
Gnorimoschema streliciella (Herrich-Schäffer, 1854)
Gnorimoschema valesiella (Staudinger, 1877)
Helcystogramma arulensis (Rebel, 1929)
Helcystogramma lineolella (Zeller, 1839)
Helcystogramma lutatella (Herrich-Schäffer, 1854)
Helcystogramma rufescens (Haworth, 1828)
Helcystogramma triannulella (Herrich-Schäffer, 1854)
Hypatima rhomboidella (Linnaeus, 1758)
Isophrictis anthemidella (Wocke, 1871)
Isophrictis striatella (Denis & Schiffermuller, 1775)
Iwaruna biguttella (Duponchel, 1843)
Iwaruna klimeschi Wolff, 1958
Klimeschiopsis kiningerella (Duponchel, 1843)
Megacraspedus balneariellus (Chretien, 1907)
Megacraspedus binotella (Duponchel, 1843)
Megacraspedus dolosellus (Zeller, 1839)
Megacraspedus imparellus (Fischer von Röslerstamm, 1843)
Megacraspedus lanceolellus (Zeller, 1850)
Megacraspedus separatellus (Fischer von Röslerstamm, 1843)
Mesophleps silacella (Hübner, 1796)
Metzneria aestivella (Zeller, 1839)
Metzneria aprilella (Herrich-Schäffer, 1854)
Metzneria artificella (Herrich-Schäffer, 1861)
Metzneria ehikeella Gozmany, 1954
Metzneria lappella (Linnaeus, 1758)
Metzneria metzneriella (Stainton, 1851)
Metzneria neuropterella (Zeller, 1839)
Metzneria paucipunctella (Zeller, 1839)
Metzneria santolinella (Amsel, 1936)
Mirificarma cytisella (Treitschke, 1833)
Mirificarma eburnella (Denis & Schiffermuller, 1775)
Mirificarma interrupta (Curtis, 1827)
Mirificarma lentiginosella (Zeller, 1839)
Mirificarma maculatella (Hübner, 1796)
Mirificarma mulinella (Zeller, 1839)
Monochroa conspersella (Herrich-Schäffer, 1854)
Monochroa cytisella (Curtis, 1837)
Monochroa divisella (Douglas, 1850)
Monochroa elongella (Heinemann, 1870)
Monochroa hornigi (Staudinger, 1883)
Monochroa inflexella Svensson, 1992
Monochroa lucidella (Stephens, 1834)
Monochroa lutulentella (Zeller, 1839)
Monochroa nomadella (Zeller, 1868)
Monochroa palustrellus (Douglas, 1850)
Monochroa parvulata (Gozmany, 1957)
Monochroa rumicetella (O. Hofmann, 1868)
Monochroa sepicolella (Herrich-Schäffer, 1854)
Monochroa servella (Zeller, 1839)
Monochroa simplicella (Lienig & Zeller, 1846)
Monochroa suffusella (Douglas, 1850)
Monochroa tenebrella (Hübner, 1817)
Neofaculta ericetella (Geyer, 1832)
Neofaculta infernella (Herrich-Schäffer, 1854)
Neofriseria peliella (Treitschke, 1835)
Neofriseria singula (Staudinger, 1876)
Neotelphusa sequax (Haworth, 1828)
Nothris lemniscellus (Zeller, 1839)
Nothris verbascella (Denis & Schiffermuller, 1775)
Parachronistis albiceps (Zeller, 1839)
Paranarsia joannisiella Ragonot, 1895
Parastenolechia nigrinotella (Zeller, 1847)
Pexicopia malvella (Hübner, 1805)
Phthorimaea operculella (Zeller, 1873)
Platyedra subcinerea (Haworth, 1828)
Pogochaetia solitaria Staudinger, 1879
Prolita sexpunctella (Fabricius, 1794)
Prolita solutella (Zeller, 1839)
Pseudotelphusa paripunctella (Thunberg, 1794)
Pseudotelphusa scalella (Scopoli, 1763)
Pseudotelphusa tessella (Linnaeus, 1758)
Psoricoptera gibbosella (Zeller, 1839)
Ptocheuusa abnormella (Herrich-Schäffer, 1854)
Ptocheuusa inopella (Zeller, 1839)
Ptocheuusa paupella (Zeller, 1847)
Pyncostola bohemiella (Nickerl, 1864)
Recurvaria leucatella (Clerck, 1759)
Recurvaria nanella (Denis & Schiffermuller, 1775)
Sattleria melaleucella (Constant, 1865)
Sattleria styriaca Pitkin & Sattler, 1991
Scrobipalpa acuminatella (Sircom, 1850)
Scrobipalpa arenbergeri Povolny, 1973
Scrobipalpa artemisiella (Treitschke, 1833)
Scrobipalpa atriplicella (Fischer von Röslerstamm, 1841)
Scrobipalpa brahmiella (Heyden, 1862)
Scrobipalpa chrysanthemella (E. Hofmann, 1867)
Scrobipalpa erichi Povolny, 1964
Scrobipalpa feralella (Zeller, 1872)
Scrobipalpa halonella (Herrich-Schäffer, 1854)
Scrobipalpa hungariae (Staudinger, 1871)
Scrobipalpa hyoscyamella (Stainton, 1869)
Scrobipalpa murinella (Duponchel, 1843)
Scrobipalpa nitentella (Fuchs, 1902)
Scrobipalpa obsoletella (Fischer von Röslerstamm, 1841)
Scrobipalpa ocellatella (Boyd, 1858)
Scrobipalpa pauperella (Heinemann, 1870)
Scrobipalpa proclivella (Fuchs, 1886)
Scrobipalpa rebeli (Preissecker, 1914)
Scrobipalpa salicorniae (E. Hering, 1889)
Scrobipalpa samadensis (Pfaffenzeller, 1870)
Scrobipalpa stangei (E. Hering, 1889)
Scrobipalpopsis petasitis (Pfaffenzeller, 1867)
Scrobipalpula diffluella (Frey, 1870)
Scrobipalpula psilella (Herrich-Schäffer, 1854)
Scrobipalpula tussilaginis (Stainton, 1867)
Sitotroga cerealella (Olivier, 1789)
Sophronia ascalis Gozmany, 1951
Sophronia chilonella (Treitschke, 1833)
Sophronia consanguinella Herrich-Schäffer, 1854
Sophronia humerella (Denis & Schiffermuller, 1775)
Sophronia illustrella (Hübner, 1796)
Sophronia semicostella (Hübner, 1813)
Sophronia sicariellus (Zeller, 1839)
Stenolechia gemmella (Linnaeus, 1758)
Stenolechiodes pseudogemmellus Elsner, 1996
Stomopteryx flavipalpella Jackh, 1959
Stomopteryx remissella (Zeller, 1847)
Syncopacma albifrontella (Heinemann, 1870)
Syncopacma albipalpella (Herrich-Schäffer, 1854)
Syncopacma azosterella (Herrich-Schäffer, 1854)
Syncopacma cinctella (Clerck, 1759)
Syncopacma cincticulella (Bruand, 1851)
Syncopacma coronillella (Treitschke, 1833)
Syncopacma incognitana Gozmany, 1957
Syncopacma larseniella Gozmany, 1957
Syncopacma linella (Chretien, 1904)
Syncopacma ochrofasciella (Toll, 1936)
Syncopacma patruella (Mann, 1857)
Syncopacma polychromella (Rebel, 1902)
Syncopacma sangiella (Stainton, 1863)
Syncopacma suecicella (Wolff, 1958)
Syncopacma taeniolella (Zeller, 1839)
Syncopacma vinella (Bankes, 1898)
Syncopacma wormiella (Wolff, 1958)
Teleiodes flavimaculella (Herrich-Schäffer, 1854)
Teleiodes luculella (Hübner, 1813)
Teleiodes saltuum (Zeller, 1878)
Teleiodes vulgella (Denis & Schiffermuller, 1775)
Teleiodes wagae (Nowicki, 1860)
Teleiopsis albifemorella (E. Hofmann, 1867)
Teleiopsis bagriotella (Duponchel, 1840)
Teleiopsis diffinis (Haworth, 1828)
Thiotricha subocellea (Stephens, 1834)
Tila capsophilella (Chretien, 1900)
Tuta absoluta (Meyrick, 1917)
Xystophora carchariella (Zeller, 1839)
Xystophora pulveratella (Herrich-Schäffer, 1854)

Geometridae
Abraxas grossulariata (Linnaeus, 1758)
Abraxas sylvata (Scopoli, 1763)
Acasis appensata (Eversmann, 1842)
Acasis viretata (Hübner, 1799)
Aethalura punctulata (Denis & Schiffermuller, 1775)
Agriopis aurantiaria (Hübner, 1799)
Agriopis bajaria (Denis & Schiffermuller, 1775)
Agriopis leucophaearia (Denis & Schiffermuller, 1775)
Agriopis marginaria (Fabricius, 1776)
Alcis bastelbergeri (Hirschke, 1908)
Alcis jubata (Thunberg, 1788)
Alcis repandata (Linnaeus, 1758)
Alsophila aceraria (Denis & Schiffermuller, 1775)
Alsophila aescularia (Denis & Schiffermuller, 1775)
Angerona prunaria (Linnaeus, 1758)
Anticlea derivata (Denis & Schiffermuller, 1775)
Anticollix sparsata (Treitschke, 1828)
Apeira syringaria (Linnaeus, 1758)
Aplasta ononaria (Fuessly, 1783)
Aplocera efformata (Guenee, 1858)
Aplocera plagiata (Linnaeus, 1758)
Aplocera praeformata (Hübner, 1826)
Aplocera simpliciata (Treitschke, 1835)
Apocheima hispidaria (Denis & Schiffermuller, 1775)
Archiearis parthenias (Linnaeus, 1761)
Arichanna melanaria (Linnaeus, 1758)
Artiora evonymaria (Denis & Schiffermuller, 1775)
Ascotis selenaria (Denis & Schiffermuller, 1775)
Aspitates gilvaria (Denis & Schiffermuller, 1775)
Asthena albulata (Hufnagel, 1767)
Asthena anseraria (Herrich-Schäffer, 1855)
Baptria tibiale (Esper, 1791)
Biston betularia (Linnaeus, 1758)
Biston strataria (Hufnagel, 1767)
Boudinotiana notha (Hübner, 1803)
Boudinotiana puella (Esper, 1787)
Bupalus piniaria (Linnaeus, 1758)
Cabera exanthemata (Scopoli, 1763)
Cabera leptographa Wehrli, 1936
Cabera pusaria (Linnaeus, 1758)
Campaea honoraria (Denis & Schiffermuller, 1775)
Campaea margaritaria (Linnaeus, 1761)
Camptogramma bilineata (Linnaeus, 1758)
Camptogramma scripturata (Hübner, 1799)
Carsia sororiata (Hübner, 1813)
Cataclysme riguata (Hübner, 1813)
Catarhoe cuculata (Hufnagel, 1767)
Catarhoe rubidata (Denis & Schiffermuller, 1775)
Cepphis advenaria (Hübner, 1790)
Chariaspilates formosaria (Eversmann, 1837)
Charissa obscurata (Denis & Schiffermuller, 1775)
Charissa pullata (Denis & Schiffermuller, 1775)
Charissa variegata (Duponchel, 1830)
Charissa ambiguata (Duponchel, 1830)
Charissa intermedia (Wehrli, 1917)
Charissa glaucinaria (Hübner, 1799)
Chesias legatella (Denis & Schiffermuller, 1775)
Chesias rufata (Fabricius, 1775)
Chiasmia clathrata (Linnaeus, 1758)
Chlorissa cloraria (Hübner, 1813)
Chlorissa viridata (Linnaeus, 1758)
Chloroclysta miata (Linnaeus, 1758)
Chloroclysta siterata (Hufnagel, 1767)
Chloroclystis v-ata (Haworth, 1809)
Chondrosoma fiduciaria Anker, 1854
Cidaria fulvata (Forster, 1771)
Cleora cinctaria (Denis & Schiffermuller, 1775)
Cleorodes lichenaria (Hufnagel, 1767)
Coenocalpe lapidata (Hübner, 1809)
Coenotephria ablutaria (Boisduval, 1840)
Coenotephria salicata (Denis & Schiffermuller, 1775)
Coenotephria tophaceata (Denis & Schiffermuller, 1775)
Colostygia aptata (Hübner, 1813)
Colostygia aqueata (Hübner, 1813)
Colostygia austriacaria (Herrich-Schäffer, 1852)
Colostygia kollariaria (Herrich-Schäffer, 1848)
Colostygia laetaria (de La Harpe, 1853)
Colostygia olivata (Denis & Schiffermuller, 1775)
Colostygia pectinataria (Knoch, 1781)
Colostygia puengeleri (Stertz, 1902)
Colostygia tempestaria (Herrich-Schäffer, 1852)
Colostygia turbata (Hübner, 1799)
Colotois pennaria (Linnaeus, 1761)
Comibaena bajularia (Denis & Schiffermuller, 1775)
Cosmorhoe ocellata (Linnaeus, 1758)
Costaconvexa polygrammata (Borkhausen, 1794)
Crocallis elinguaria (Linnaeus, 1758)
Crocallis tusciaria (Borkhausen, 1793)
Crocota niveata (Scopoli, 1763)
Crocota tinctaria (Hübner, 1799)
Cyclophora linearia (Hübner, 1799)
Cyclophora porata (Linnaeus, 1767)
Cyclophora punctaria (Linnaeus, 1758)
Cyclophora suppunctaria (Zeller, 1847)
Cyclophora albiocellaria (Hübner, 1789)
Cyclophora albipunctata (Hufnagel, 1767)
Cyclophora annularia (Fabricius, 1775)
Cyclophora pendularia (Clerck, 1759)
Cyclophora puppillaria (Hübner, 1799)
Cyclophora quercimontaria (Bastelberger, 1897)
Cyclophora ruficiliaria (Herrich-Schäffer, 1855)
Deileptenia ribeata (Clerck, 1759)
Dyscia conspersaria (Denis & Schiffermuller, 1775)
Dyscia raunaria (Freyer, 1852)
Dyscia fagaria (Thunberg, 1784)
Dysstroma citrata (Linnaeus, 1761)
Dysstroma truncata (Hufnagel, 1767)
Earophila badiata (Denis & Schiffermuller, 1775)
Ecliptopera capitata (Herrich-Schäffer, 1839)
Ecliptopera silaceata (Denis & Schiffermuller, 1775)
Ectropis crepuscularia (Denis & Schiffermuller, 1775)
Eilicrinia cordiaria (Hübner, 1790)
Electrophaes corylata (Thunberg, 1792)
Elophos caelibaria (Heydenreich, 1851)
Elophos operaria (Hübner, 1813)
Elophos zelleraria (Freyer, 1836)
Elophos zirbitzensis (Pieszcek, 1902)
Elophos dilucidaria (Denis & Schiffermuller, 1775)
Elophos serotinaria (Denis & Schiffermuller, 1775)
Elophos vittaria (Thunberg, 1788)
Ematurga atomaria (Linnaeus, 1758)
Ennomos alniaria (Linnaeus, 1758)
Ennomos autumnaria (Werneburg, 1859)
Ennomos erosaria (Denis & Schiffermuller, 1775)
Ennomos fuscantaria (Haworth, 1809)
Ennomos quercaria (Hübner, 1813)
Ennomos quercinaria (Hufnagel, 1767)
Entephria caesiata (Denis & Schiffermuller, 1775)
Entephria cyanata (Hübner, 1809)
Entephria flavata (Osthelder, 1929)
Entephria flavicinctata (Hübner, 1813)
Entephria infidaria (de La Harpe, 1853)
Entephria nobiliaria (Herrich-Schäffer, 1852)
Epilobophora sabinata (Geyer, 1831)
Epione repandaria (Hufnagel, 1767)
Epione vespertaria (Linnaeus, 1767)
Epirranthis diversata (Denis & Schiffermuller, 1775)
Epirrhoe alternata (Muller, 1764)
Epirrhoe galiata (Denis & Schiffermuller, 1775)
Epirrhoe hastulata (Hübner, 1790)
Epirrhoe molluginata (Hübner, 1813)
Epirrhoe pupillata (Thunberg, 1788)
Epirrhoe rivata (Hübner, 1813)
Epirrhoe tristata (Linnaeus, 1758)
Epirrita autumnata (Borkhausen, 1794)
Epirrita christyi (Allen, 1906)
Epirrita dilutata (Denis & Schiffermuller, 1775)
Erannis defoliaria (Clerck, 1759)
Euchoeca nebulata (Scopoli, 1763)
Eulithis mellinata (Fabricius, 1787)
Eulithis populata (Linnaeus, 1758)
Eulithis prunata (Linnaeus, 1758)
Eulithis testata (Linnaeus, 1761)
Eumannia lepraria (Rebel, 1909)
Euphyia adumbraria (Herrich-Schäffer, 1852)
Euphyia biangulata (Haworth, 1809)
Euphyia frustata (Treitschke, 1828)
Euphyia mesembrina (Rebel, 1927)
Euphyia unangulata (Haworth, 1809)
Eupithecia abbreviata Stephens, 1831
Eupithecia abietaria (Goeze, 1781)
Eupithecia absinthiata (Clerck, 1759)
Eupithecia actaeata Walderdorff, 1869
Eupithecia addictata Dietze, 1908
Eupithecia alliaria Staudinger, 1870
Eupithecia analoga Djakonov, 1926
Eupithecia assimilata Doubleday, 1856
Eupithecia carpophagata Staudinger, 1871
Eupithecia cauchiata (Duponchel, 1831)
Eupithecia centaureata (Denis & Schiffermuller, 1775)
Eupithecia conterminata (Lienig, 1846)
Eupithecia cretaceata (Packard, 1874)
Eupithecia denotata (Hübner, 1813)
Eupithecia distinctaria Herrich-Schäffer, 1848
Eupithecia dodoneata Guenee, 1858
Eupithecia druentiata Dietze, 1902
Eupithecia egenaria Herrich-Schäffer, 1848
Eupithecia ericeata (Rambur, 1833)
Eupithecia exiguata (Hübner, 1813)
Eupithecia expallidata Doubleday, 1856
Eupithecia extraversaria Herrich-Schäffer, 1852
Eupithecia extremata (Fabricius, 1787)
Eupithecia gemellata Herrich-Schäffer, 1861
Eupithecia graphata (Treitschke, 1828)
Eupithecia gueneata Milliere, 1862
Eupithecia haworthiata Doubleday, 1856
Eupithecia icterata (de Villers, 1789)
Eupithecia immundata (Lienig, 1846)
Eupithecia impurata (Hübner, 1813)
Eupithecia indigata (Hübner, 1813)
Eupithecia innotata (Hufnagel, 1767)
Eupithecia insigniata (Hübner, 1790)
Eupithecia intricata (Zetterstedt, 1839)
Eupithecia inturbata (Hübner, 1817)
Eupithecia irriguata (Hübner, 1813)
Eupithecia lanceata (Hübner, 1825)
Eupithecia laquaearia Herrich-Schäffer, 1848
Eupithecia lariciata (Freyer, 1841)
Eupithecia linariata (Denis & Schiffermuller, 1775)
Eupithecia millefoliata Rossler, 1866
Eupithecia nanata (Hübner, 1813)
Eupithecia orphnata W. Petersen, 1909
Eupithecia pauxillaria Boisduval, 1840
Eupithecia pernotata Guenee, 1858
Eupithecia pimpinellata (Hübner, 1813)
Eupithecia plumbeolata (Haworth, 1809)
Eupithecia pusillata (Denis & Schiffermuller, 1775)
Eupithecia pygmaeata (Hübner, 1799)
Eupithecia pyreneata Mabille, 1871
Eupithecia satyrata (Hübner, 1813)
Eupithecia schiefereri Bohatsch, 1893
Eupithecia selinata Herrich-Schäffer, 1861
Eupithecia semigraphata Bruand, 1850
Eupithecia silenata Assmann, 1848
Eupithecia silenicolata Mabille, 1867
Eupithecia simpliciata (Haworth, 1809)
Eupithecia sinuosaria (Eversmann, 1848)
Eupithecia subfuscata (Haworth, 1809)
Eupithecia subumbrata (Denis & Schiffermuller, 1775)
Eupithecia succenturiata (Linnaeus, 1758)
Eupithecia tantillaria Boisduval, 1840
Eupithecia tenuiata (Hübner, 1813)
Eupithecia thalictrata (Pungeler, 1902)
Eupithecia tripunctaria Herrich-Schäffer, 1852
Eupithecia trisignaria Herrich-Schäffer, 1848
Eupithecia undata (Freyer, 1840)
Eupithecia valerianata (Hübner, 1813)
Eupithecia venosata (Fabricius, 1787)
Eupithecia veratraria Herrich-Schäffer, 1848
Eupithecia virgaureata Doubleday, 1861
Eupithecia vulgata (Haworth, 1809)
Eustroma reticulata (Denis & Schiffermuller, 1775)
Fagivorina arenaria (Hufnagel, 1767)
Gagitodes sagittata (Fabricius, 1787)
Gandaritis pyraliata (Denis & Schiffermuller, 1775)
Geometra papilionaria (Linnaeus, 1758)
Glacies alpinata (Scopoli, 1763)
Glacies alticolaria (Mann, 1853)
Glacies burmanni (Tarmann, 1984)
Glacies canaliculata (Hochenwarth, 1785)
Glacies coracina (Esper, 1805)
Glacies noricana (Wagner, 1898)
Glacies spitzi (Rebel, 1906)
Gnophos furvata (Denis & Schiffermuller, 1775)
Gnophos obfuscata (Denis & Schiffermuller, 1775)
Gnophos dumetata Treitschke, 1827
Gymnoscelis rufifasciata (Haworth, 1809)
Heliomata glarearia (Denis & Schiffermuller, 1775)
Hemistola chrysoprasaria (Esper, 1795)
Hemithea aestivaria (Hübner, 1789)
Horisme aemulata (Hübner, 1813)
Horisme aquata (Hübner, 1813)
Horisme calligraphata (Herrich-Schäffer, 1838)
Horisme corticata (Treitschke, 1835)
Horisme radicaria (de La Harpe, 1855)
Horisme tersata (Denis & Schiffermuller, 1775)
Horisme vitalbata (Denis & Schiffermuller, 1775)
Hydrelia flammeolaria (Hufnagel, 1767)
Hydrelia sylvata (Denis & Schiffermuller, 1775)
Hydria cervinalis (Scopoli, 1763)
Hydria undulata (Linnaeus, 1758)
Hydriomena furcata (Thunberg, 1784)
Hydriomena impluviata (Denis & Schiffermuller, 1775)
Hydriomena ruberata (Freyer, 1831)
Hylaea fasciaria (Linnaeus, 1758)
Hypomecis danieli (Wehrli, 1932)
Hypomecis punctinalis (Scopoli, 1763)
Hypomecis roboraria (Denis & Schiffermuller, 1775)
Hypoxystis pluviaria (Fabricius, 1787)
Idaea aureolaria (Denis & Schiffermuller, 1775)
Idaea aversata (Linnaeus, 1758)
Idaea biselata (Hufnagel, 1767)
Idaea contiguaria (Hübner, 1799)
Idaea degeneraria (Hübner, 1799)
Idaea deversaria (Herrich-Schäffer, 1847)
Idaea dilutaria (Hübner, 1799)
Idaea dimidiata (Hufnagel, 1767)
Idaea emarginata (Linnaeus, 1758)
Idaea filicata (Hübner, 1799)
Idaea flaveolaria (Hübner, 1809)
Idaea fuscovenosa (Goeze, 1781)
Idaea humiliata (Hufnagel, 1767)
Idaea inquinata (Scopoli, 1763)
Idaea laevigata (Scopoli, 1763)
Idaea moniliata (Denis & Schiffermuller, 1775)
Idaea muricata (Hufnagel, 1767)
Idaea nitidata (Herrich-Schäffer, 1861)
Idaea obsoletaria (Rambur, 1833)
Idaea ochrata (Scopoli, 1763)
Idaea pallidata (Denis & Schiffermuller, 1775)
Idaea rubraria (Staudinger, 1901)
Idaea rufaria (Hübner, 1799)
Idaea rusticata (Denis & Schiffermuller, 1775)
Idaea seriata (Schrank, 1802)
Idaea sericeata (Hübner, 1813)
Idaea serpentata (Hufnagel, 1767)
Idaea straminata (Borkhausen, 1794)
Idaea subsericeata (Haworth, 1809)
Idaea sylvestraria (Hübner, 1799)
Idaea trigeminata (Haworth, 1809)
Idaea typicata (Guenee, 1858)
Isturgia arenacearia (Denis & Schiffermuller, 1775)
Isturgia limbaria (Fabricius, 1775)
Isturgia murinaria (Denis & Schiffermuller, 1775)
Isturgia roraria (Fabricius, 1776)
Jodis lactearia (Linnaeus, 1758)
Jodis putata (Linnaeus, 1758)
Lampropteryx otregiata (Metcalfe, 1917)
Lampropteryx suffumata (Denis & Schiffermuller, 1775)
Larentia clavaria (Haworth, 1809)
Ligdia adustata (Denis & Schiffermuller, 1775)
Lignyoptera fumidaria (Hübner, 1825)
Lithostege farinata (Hufnagel, 1767)
Lithostege griseata (Denis & Schiffermuller, 1775)
Lobophora halterata (Hufnagel, 1767)
Lomaspilis marginata (Linnaeus, 1758)
Lomographa bimaculata (Fabricius, 1775)
Lomographa temerata (Denis & Schiffermuller, 1775)
Lycia alpina (Sulzer, 1776)
Lycia hirtaria (Clerck, 1759)
Lycia isabellae (Harrison, 1914)
Lycia pomonaria (Hübner, 1790)
Lycia zonaria (Denis & Schiffermuller, 1775)
Lythria cruentaria (Hufnagel, 1767)
Lythria plumularia (Freyer, 1831)
Lythria purpuraria (Linnaeus, 1758)
Macaria alternata (Denis & Schiffermuller, 1775)
Macaria artesiaria (Denis & Schiffermuller, 1775)
Macaria brunneata (Thunberg, 1784)
Macaria carbonaria (Clerck, 1759)
Macaria fusca (Thunberg, 1792)
Macaria liturata (Clerck, 1759)
Macaria notata (Linnaeus, 1758)
Macaria signaria (Hübner, 1809)
Macaria wauaria (Linnaeus, 1758)
Martania taeniata (Stephens, 1831)
Melanthia alaudaria (Freyer, 1846)
Melanthia procellata (Denis & Schiffermuller, 1775)
Menophra abruptaria (Thunberg, 1792)
Mesoleuca albicillata (Linnaeus, 1758)
Mesotype didymata (Linnaeus, 1758)
Mesotype parallelolineata (Retzius, 1783)
Mesotype verberata (Scopoli, 1763)
Minoa murinata (Scopoli, 1763)
Narraga fasciolaria (Hufnagel, 1767)
Narraga tessularia (Metzner, 1845)
Nebula achromaria (de La Harpe, 1853)
Nebula nebulata (Treitschke, 1828)
Nothocasis sertata (Hübner, 1817)
Nycterosea obstipata (Fabricius, 1794)
Odezia atrata (Linnaeus, 1758)
Odontopera bidentata (Clerck, 1759)
Operophtera brumata (Linnaeus, 1758)
Operophtera fagata (Scharfenberg, 1805)
Opisthograptis luteolata (Linnaeus, 1758)
Orthonama vittata (Borkhausen, 1794)
Ourapteryx sambucaria (Linnaeus, 1758)
Pachycnemia hippocastanaria (Hübner, 1799)
Paradarisa consonaria (Hübner, 1799)
Parectropis similaria (Hufnagel, 1767)
Pareulype berberata (Denis & Schiffermuller, 1775)
Pasiphila chloerata (Mabille, 1870)
Pasiphila debiliata (Hübner, 1817)
Pasiphila rectangulata (Linnaeus, 1758)
Pelurga comitata (Linnaeus, 1758)
Pennithera firmata (Hübner, 1822)
Perconia strigillaria (Hübner, 1787)
Peribatodes rhomboidaria (Denis & Schiffermuller, 1775)
Peribatodes secundaria (Denis & Schiffermuller, 1775)
Perizoma affinitata (Stephens, 1831)
Perizoma albulata (Denis & Schiffermuller, 1775)
Perizoma alchemillata (Linnaeus, 1758)
Perizoma bifaciata (Haworth, 1809)
Perizoma blandiata (Denis & Schiffermuller, 1775)
Perizoma flavofasciata (Thunberg, 1792)
Perizoma hydrata (Treitschke, 1829)
Perizoma incultaria (Herrich-Schäffer, 1848)
Perizoma lugdunaria (Herrich-Schäffer, 1855)
Perizoma minorata (Treitschke, 1828)
Perizoma obsoletata (Herrich-Schäffer, 1838)
Petrophora chlorosata (Scopoli, 1763)
Phaiogramma etruscaria (Zeller, 1849)
Phibalapteryx virgata (Hufnagel, 1767)
Phigalia pilosaria (Denis & Schiffermuller, 1775)
Philereme transversata (Hufnagel, 1767)
Philereme vetulata (Denis & Schiffermuller, 1775)
Plagodis dolabraria (Linnaeus, 1767)
Plagodis pulveraria (Linnaeus, 1758)
Plemyria rubiginata (Denis & Schiffermuller, 1775)
Pseudopanthera macularia (Linnaeus, 1758)
Pseudoterpna pruinata (Hufnagel, 1767)
Psodos quadrifaria (Sulzer, 1776)
Pterapherapteryx sexalata (Retzius, 1783)
Pungeleria capreolaria (Denis & Schiffermuller, 1775)
Rheumaptera hastata (Linnaeus, 1758)
Rheumaptera subhastata (Nolcken, 1870)
Rhodometra sacraria (Linnaeus, 1767)
Rhodostrophia vibicaria (Clerck, 1759)
Schistostege decussata (Denis & Schiffermuller, 1775)
Sciadia tenebraria (Esper, 1806)
Scopula confinaria (Herrich-Schäffer, 1847)
Scopula emutaria (Hübner, 1809)
Scopula flaccidaria (Zeller, 1852)
Scopula floslactata (Haworth, 1809)
Scopula immutata (Linnaeus, 1758)
Scopula incanata (Linnaeus, 1758)
Scopula marginepunctata (Goeze, 1781)
Scopula subpunctaria (Herrich-Schäffer, 1847)
Scopula ternata Schrank, 1802
Scopula caricaria (Reutti, 1853)
Scopula corrivalaria (Kretschmar, 1862)
Scopula decorata (Denis & Schiffermuller, 1775)
Scopula immorata (Linnaeus, 1758)
Scopula nemoraria (Hübner, 1799)
Scopula nigropunctata (Hufnagel, 1767)
Scopula ornata (Scopoli, 1763)
Scopula rubiginata (Hufnagel, 1767)
Scopula umbelaria (Hübner, 1813)
Scopula virgulata (Denis & Schiffermuller, 1775)
Scotopteryx bipunctaria (Denis & Schiffermuller, 1775)
Scotopteryx chenopodiata (Linnaeus, 1758)
Scotopteryx coarctaria (Denis & Schiffermuller, 1775)
Scotopteryx ignorata Huemer & Hausmann, 1998
Scotopteryx luridata (Hufnagel, 1767)
Scotopteryx moeniata (Scopoli, 1763)
Scotopteryx mucronata (Scopoli, 1763)
Scotopteryx octodurensis (Favre, 1903)
Selenia dentaria (Fabricius, 1775)
Selenia lunularia (Hübner, 1788)
Selenia tetralunaria (Hufnagel, 1767)
Selidosema brunnearia (de Villers, 1789)
Selidosema plumaria (Denis & Schiffermuller, 1775)
Siona lineata (Scopoli, 1763)
Spargania luctuata (Denis & Schiffermuller, 1775)
Stegania cararia (Hübner, 1790)
Stegania dilectaria (Hübner, 1790)
Stegania trimaculata (de Villers, 1789)
Synopsia sociaria (Hübner, 1799)
Tephronia sepiaria (Hufnagel, 1767)
Thalera fimbrialis (Scopoli, 1763)
Thera britannica (Turner, 1925)
Thera cembrae (Kitt, 1912)
Thera cognata (Thunberg, 1792)
Thera juniperata (Linnaeus, 1758)
Thera obeliscata (Hübner, 1787)
Thera variata (Denis & Schiffermuller, 1775)
Thera vetustata (Denis & Schiffermuller, 1775)
Therapis flavicaria (Denis & Schiffermuller, 1775)
Theria primaria (Haworth, 1809)
Theria rupicapraria (Denis & Schiffermuller, 1775)
Thetidia smaragdaria (Fabricius, 1787)
Timandra comae Schmidt, 1931
Trichopteryx carpinata (Borkhausen, 1794)
Trichopteryx polycommata (Denis & Schiffermuller, 1775)
Triphosa dubitata (Linnaeus, 1758)
Triphosa sabaudiata (Duponchel, 1830)
Venusia blomeri (Curtis, 1832)
Venusia cambrica Curtis, 1839
Xanthorhoe biriviata (Borkhausen, 1794)
Xanthorhoe decoloraria (Esper, 1806)
Xanthorhoe designata (Hufnagel, 1767)
Xanthorhoe ferrugata (Clerck, 1759)
Xanthorhoe fluctuata (Linnaeus, 1758)
Xanthorhoe incursata (Hübner, 1813)
Xanthorhoe montanata (Denis & Schiffermuller, 1775)
Xanthorhoe quadrifasiata (Clerck, 1759)
Xanthorhoe spadicearia (Denis & Schiffermuller, 1775)

Glyphipterigidae
Acrolepia autumnitella Curtis, 1838
Acrolepiopsis assectella (Zeller, 1839)
Acrolepiopsis betulella (Curtis, 1838)
Digitivalva arnicella (Heyden, 1863)
Digitivalva perlepidella (Stainton, 1849)
Digitivalva reticulella (Hübner, 1796)
Digitivalva valeriella (Snellen, 1878)
Digitivalva granitella (Treitschke, 1833)
Digitivalva pulicariae (Klimesch, 1956)
Glyphipterix bergstraesserella (Fabricius, 1781)
Glyphipterix equitella (Scopoli, 1763)
Glyphipterix forsterella (Fabricius, 1781)
Glyphipterix gianelliella Ragonot, 1885
Glyphipterix haworthana (Stephens, 1834)
Glyphipterix schoenicolella Boyd, 1859
Glyphipterix simpliciella (Stephens, 1834)
Glyphipterix thrasonella (Scopoli, 1763)
Orthotelia sparganella (Thunberg, 1788)

Gracillariidae
Acrocercops brongniardella (Fabricius, 1798)
Aristaea pavoniella (Zeller, 1847)
Aspilapteryx limosella (Duponchel, 1843)
Aspilapteryx spectabilis Huemer, 1994
Aspilapteryx tringipennella (Zeller, 1839)
Callisto basistrigella Huemer, Deutsch & Triberti, 2015
Callisto coffeella (Zetterstedt, 1839)
Callisto denticulella (Thunberg, 1794)
Callisto insperatella (Nickerl, 1864)
Callisto pfaffenzelleri (Frey, 1856)
Caloptilia alchimiella (Scopoli, 1763)
Caloptilia azaleella (Brants, 1913)
Caloptilia betulicola (M. Hering, 1928)
Caloptilia cuculipennella (Hübner, 1796)
Caloptilia elongella (Linnaeus, 1761)
Caloptilia falconipennella (Hübner, 1813)
Caloptilia fidella (Reutti, 1853)
Caloptilia fribergensis (Fritzsche, 1871)
Caloptilia hauderi (Rebel, 1906)
Caloptilia hemidactylella (Denis & Schiffermuller, 1775)
Caloptilia honoratella (Rebel, 1914)
Caloptilia populetorum (Zeller, 1839)
Caloptilia rhodinella (Herrich-Schäffer, 1855)
Caloptilia robustella Jackh, 1972
Caloptilia roscipennella (Hübner, 1796)
Caloptilia rufipennella (Hübner, 1796)
Caloptilia semifascia (Haworth, 1828)
Caloptilia stigmatella (Fabricius, 1781)
Calybites phasianipennella (Hübner, 1813)
Calybites quadrisignella (Zeller, 1839)
Cameraria ohridella Deschka & Dimic, 1986
Dialectica imperialella (Zeller, 1847)
Dialectica soffneri (Gregor & Povolny, 1965)
Euspilapteryx auroguttella Stephens, 1835
Gracillaria loriolella Frey, 1881
Gracillaria syringella (Fabricius, 1794)
Leucospilapteryx omissella (Stainton, 1848)
Micrurapteryx kollariella (Zeller, 1839)
Ornixola caudulatella (Zeller, 1839)
Parectopa ononidis (Zeller, 1839)
Parectopa robiniella Clemens, 1863
Parornix alpicola (Wocke, 1877)
Parornix anglicella (Stainton, 1850)
Parornix anguliferella (Zeller, 1847)
Parornix betulae (Stainton, 1854)
Parornix carpinella (Frey, 1863)
Parornix devoniella (Stainton, 1850)
Parornix fagivora (Frey, 1861)
Parornix finitimella (Zeller, 1850)
Parornix ornatella Triberti, 1981
Parornix petiolella (Frey, 1863)
Parornix scoticella (Stainton, 1850)
Parornix szocsi Gozmany, 1952
Parornix tenella (Rebel, 1919)
Parornix torquillella (Zeller, 1850)
Phyllocnistis labyrinthella (Bjerkander, 1790)
Phyllocnistis saligna (Zeller, 1839)
Phyllocnistis unipunctella (Stephens, 1834)
Phyllocnistis xenia M. Hering, 1936
Phyllonorycter abrasella (Duponchel, 1843)
Phyllonorycter acaciella (Duponchel, 1843)
Phyllonorycter acerifoliella (Zeller, 1839)
Phyllonorycter aemula Triberti, Deschka & Huemer, 1997
Phyllonorycter agilella (Zeller, 1846)
Phyllonorycter alpina (Frey, 1856)
Phyllonorycter anderidae (W. Fletcher, 1885)
Phyllonorycter apparella (Herrich-Schäffer, 1855)
Phyllonorycter blancardella (Fabricius, 1781)
Phyllonorycter cavella (Zeller, 1846)
Phyllonorycter cerasicolella (Herrich-Schäffer, 1855)
Phyllonorycter cerasinella (Reutti, 1852)
Phyllonorycter comparella (Duponchel, 1843)
Phyllonorycter connexella (Zeller, 1846)
Phyllonorycter coryli (Nicelli, 1851)
Phyllonorycter corylifoliella (Hübner, 1796)
Phyllonorycter cydoniella (Denis & Schiffermuller, 1775)
Phyllonorycter delitella (Duponchel, 1843)
Phyllonorycter deschkai Triberti, 2007
Phyllonorycter distentella (Zeller, 1846)
Phyllonorycter dubitella (Herrich-Schäffer, 1855)
Phyllonorycter emberizaepenella (Bouche, 1834)
Phyllonorycter esperella (Goeze, 1783)
Phyllonorycter fraxinella (Zeller, 1846)
Phyllonorycter froelichiella (Zeller, 1839)
Phyllonorycter geniculella (Ragonot, 1874)
Phyllonorycter harrisella (Linnaeus, 1761)
Phyllonorycter heegeriella (Zeller, 1846)
Phyllonorycter helianthemella (Herrich-Schäffer, 1861)
Phyllonorycter hilarella (Zetterstedt, 1839)
Phyllonorycter ilicifoliella (Duponchel, 1843)
Phyllonorycter insignitella (Zeller, 1846)
Phyllonorycter issikii (Kumata, 1963)
Phyllonorycter joannisi (Le Marchand, 1936)
Phyllonorycter junoniella (Zeller, 1846)
Phyllonorycter klemannella (Fabricius, 1781)
Phyllonorycter lantanella (Schrank, 1802)
Phyllonorycter lautella (Zeller, 1846)
Phyllonorycter leucographella (Zeller, 1850)
Phyllonorycter maestingella (Muller, 1764)
Phyllonorycter mannii (Zeller, 1846)
Phyllonorycter medicaginella (Gerasimov, 1930)
Phyllonorycter mespilella (Hübner, 1805)
Phyllonorycter messaniella (Zeller, 1846)
Phyllonorycter muelleriella (Zeller, 1839)
Phyllonorycter nicellii (Stainton, 1851)
Phyllonorycter nigrescentella (Logan, 1851)
Phyllonorycter oxyacanthae (Frey, 1856)
Phyllonorycter parisiella (Wocke, 1848)
Phyllonorycter pastorella (Zeller, 1846)
Phyllonorycter platani (Staudinger, 1870)
Phyllonorycter populifoliella (Treitschke, 1833)
Phyllonorycter pyrifoliella (Gerasimov, 1933)
Phyllonorycter quercifoliella (Zeller, 1839)
Phyllonorycter quinqueguttella (Stainton, 1851)
Phyllonorycter rajella (Linnaeus, 1758)
Phyllonorycter robiniella (Clemens, 1859)
Phyllonorycter roboris (Zeller, 1839)
Phyllonorycter sagitella (Bjerkander, 1790)
Phyllonorycter salicicolella (Sircom, 1848)
Phyllonorycter salictella (Zeller, 1846)
Phyllonorycter scabiosella (Douglas, 1853)
Phyllonorycter schreberella (Fabricius, 1781)
Phyllonorycter scitulella (Duponchel, 1843)
Phyllonorycter sorbi (Frey, 1855)
Phyllonorycter spinicolella (Zeller, 1846)
Phyllonorycter staintoniella (Nicelli, 1853)
Phyllonorycter stettinensis (Nicelli, 1852)
Phyllonorycter strigulatella (Lienig & Zeller, 1846)
Phyllonorycter tenerella (de Joannis, 1915)
Phyllonorycter trifasciella (Haworth, 1828)
Phyllonorycter tristrigella (Haworth, 1828)
Phyllonorycter ulmifoliella (Hübner, 1817)
Phyllonorycter viminetorum (Stainton, 1854)
Povolnya leucapennella (Stephens, 1835)
Sauterina hofmanniella (Schleich, 1867)

Heliodinidae
Heliodines roesella (Linnaeus, 1758)

Heliozelidae
Antispila metallella (Denis & Schiffermuller, 1775)
Antispila treitschkiella (Fischer von Röslerstamm, 1843)
Heliozela hammoniella Sorhagen, 1885
Heliozela resplendella (Stainton, 1851)
Heliozela sericiella (Haworth, 1828)

Hepialidae
Gazoryctra ganna (Hübner, 1808)
Hepialus humuli (Linnaeus, 1758)
Pharmacis carna (Denis & Schiffermuller, 1775)
Pharmacis fusconebulosa (DeGeer, 1778)
Pharmacis lupulina (Linnaeus, 1758)
Phymatopus hecta (Linnaeus, 1758)
Triodia sylvina (Linnaeus, 1761)

Incurvariidae
Alloclemensia mesospilella (Herrich-Schäffer, 1854)
Incurvaria koerneriella (Zeller, 1839)
Incurvaria masculella (Denis & Schiffermuller, 1775)
Incurvaria oehlmanniella (Hübner, 1796)
Incurvaria pectinea Haworth, 1828
Incurvaria praelatella (Denis & Schiffermuller, 1775)
Incurvaria triglavensis Hauder, 1912
Incurvaria vetulella (Zetterstedt, 1839)
Paraclemensia cyanella (Zeller, 1850)
Phylloporia bistrigella (Haworth, 1828)

Lasiocampidae
Cosmotriche lobulina (Denis & Schiffermuller, 1775)
Dendrolimus pini (Linnaeus, 1758)
Eriogaster arbusculae Freyer, 1849
Eriogaster catax (Linnaeus, 1758)
Eriogaster lanestris (Linnaeus, 1758)
Eriogaster rimicola (Denis & Schiffermuller, 1775)
Euthrix potatoria (Linnaeus, 1758)
Gastropacha quercifolia (Linnaeus, 1758)
Gastropacha populifolia (Denis & Schiffermuller, 1775)
Lasiocampa quercus (Linnaeus, 1758)
Lasiocampa trifolii (Denis & Schiffermuller, 1775)
Macrothylacia rubi (Linnaeus, 1758)
Malacosoma castrensis (Linnaeus, 1758)
Malacosoma neustria (Linnaeus, 1758)
Malacosoma alpicola Staudinger, 1870
Odonestis pruni (Linnaeus, 1758)
Phyllodesma ilicifolia (Linnaeus, 1758)
Phyllodesma tremulifolia (Hübner, 1810)
Poecilocampa alpina (Frey & Wullschlegel, 1874)
Poecilocampa populi (Linnaeus, 1758)
Trichiura crataegi (Linnaeus, 1758)

Lecithoceridae
Homaloxestis briantiella (Turati, 1879)
Lecithocera nigrana (Duponchel, 1836)

Limacodidae
Apoda limacodes (Hufnagel, 1766)
Heterogenea asella (Denis & Schiffermuller, 1775)

Lyonetiidae
Leucoptera aceris (Fuchs, 1903)
Leucoptera genistae (M. Hering, 1933)
Leucoptera heringiella Toll, 1938
Leucoptera laburnella (Stainton, 1851)
Leucoptera lotella (Stainton, 1859)
Leucoptera lustratella (Herrich-Schäffer, 1855)
Leucoptera malifoliella (O. Costa, 1836)
Leucoptera onobrychidella Klimesch, 1937
Leucoptera sinuella (Reutti, 1853)
Leucoptera spartifoliella (Hübner, 1813)
Lyonetia clerkella (Linnaeus, 1758)
Lyonetia ledi Wocke, 1859
Lyonetia prunifoliella (Hübner, 1796)
Lyonetia pulverulentella Zeller, 1839
Phyllobrostis hartmanni Staudinger, 1867

Lypusidae
Amphisbatis incongruella (Stainton, 1849)
Lypusa maurella (Denis & Schiffermuller, 1775)
Lypusa tokari Elsner, Liska & Petru, 2008
Pseudatemelia colurnella (Mann, 1867)
Pseudatemelia flavifrontella (Denis & Schiffermuller, 1775)
Pseudatemelia latipennella (Jackh, 1959)
Pseudatemelia subochreella (Doubleday, 1859)
Pseudatemelia synchrozella (Jackh, 1959)
Pseudatemelia elsae Svensson, 1982
Pseudatemelia josephinae (Toll, 1956)

Micropterigidae
Micropterix aglaella (Duponchel, 1838)
Micropterix allionella (Fabricius, 1794)
Micropterix aruncella (Scopoli, 1763)
Micropterix aureatella (Scopoli, 1763)
Micropterix aureoviridella (Hofner, 1898)
Micropterix calthella (Linnaeus, 1761)
Micropterix mansuetella Zeller, 1844
Micropterix myrtetella Zeller, 1850
Micropterix osthelderi Heath, 1975
Micropterix paykullella (Fabricius, 1794)
Micropterix rablensis Zeller, 1868
Micropterix rothenbachii Frey, 1856
Micropterix schaefferi Heath, 1975
Micropterix tunbergella (Fabricius, 1787)

Millieridae
Millieria dolosalis (Heydenreich, 1851)

Momphidae
Mompha langiella (Hübner, 1796)
Mompha idaei (Zeller, 1839)
Mompha miscella (Denis & Schiffermuller, 1775)
Mompha bradleyi Riedl, 1965
Mompha confusella Koster & Sinev, 1996
Mompha conturbatella (Hübner, 1819)
Mompha divisella Herrich-Schäffer, 1854
Mompha epilobiella (Denis & Schiffermuller, 1775)
Mompha lacteella (Stephens, 1834)
Mompha ochraceella (Curtis, 1839)
Mompha propinquella (Stainton, 1851)
Mompha sturnipennella (Treitschke, 1833)
Mompha subbistrigella (Haworth, 1828)
Mompha locupletella (Denis & Schiffermuller, 1775)
Mompha raschkiella (Zeller, 1839)
Mompha terminella (Humphreys & Westwood, 1845)

External links
Fauna Europaea

M02
Austria02
Austria02